Montemarcello is a frazione of the comune of Ameglia (Italy). It is the home to the Regional natural Park of Montemarcello-Magra.

Cities and towns in Liguria